Congregation Beit Simchat Torah ("CBST") is a synagogue located in Manhattan, New York City. It was founded in 1973, and is the world's largest LGBT synagogue. CBST serves Jews of all sexual orientations and gender identities, their families, and their friends. Members commute from as far away as the Bronx and New Jersey. The congregation is led by Senior Rabbi Sharon Kleinbaum and Assistant Rabbi Yael Rapport. It is not affiliated with any denomination or branch of Judaism.

History
The congregation, founded in 1973 by twelve gay Jewish men led by Jacob Gubbay, originally met in Chelsea's Church of the Holy Apostles and brought its prayer materials to services each week. In 1978 they began renting space in the West Village at 57 Bethune Street, in the Westbeth Artists Community residential-artistic complex, for offices, a Hebrew school, and a sanctuary with a capacity of 300 which they use for Saturday morning services, while continuing to hold Friday night services in the church. In addition, the synagogue rents the Jacob Javits Convention Center for Yom Kippur services, which draw over 4,000 people.

Senior Rabbi Sharon Kleinbaum celebrated her 20-year anniversary with CBST in 2012.

New building
In June 2011, after 16 years of searching for a home, the congregation purchased a large space in midtown Manhattan, in a commercial condominium at 130 West 30th Street between Sixth Avenue and Seventh Avenue. The new space is located in the landmarked SJM Building designed by noted architect Cass Gilbert and built in 1927–28. Ground was broken in 2013 and construction was completed in 2016. The "Dedication of Our New Home" was marked that year with a celebration on April 3.

Notable members
Barbara Gaines (born 1956), television producer
 Brad Hoylman (born 1965), New York State Senator
Cynthia Nixon (born 1966), actress and activist
David L. Reich (born 1960), President & COO of Mount Sinai Hospital, and President of Mount Sinai Queens
Janet Weinberg (1955-2018), advocate for people with HIV/AIDS and disabilities
Edie Windsor (1929–2017), successfully brought a federal lawsuit, United States v. Windsor, against the Defense of Marriage Act
Mike Moskowitz, former Orthodox Rabbi who became an LGBTQ Ally and now works as a Scholar-in-Residence for Trans and Queer Jewish Studies at CBST 
Randi Weingarten (born 1957), president of the American Federation of Teachers

See also
Judaism and sexual orientation
Judaism and sexuality
LGBT and religion topics
LGBT clergy in Judaism
LGBT-affirming denominations in Judaism
Religion and homosexuality
Same-sex marriage and Judaism

References
Notes

Further reading

Kleinbaum, Rabbi Sharon (ed.)Siddur B'Chol L'vav'cha: With All Your Heart: The New CBST Siddur Bchol Lvavcha for Friday Night

External links

LGBT organizations based in New York City
LGBT synagogues in the United States
Jewish organizations established in 1973
Synagogues in Manhattan
Transgender topics and religion
Unaffiliated synagogues in New York City